Millville Township is a township in Clayton County, Iowa, USA.  As of the 2000 census, its population was 471.

History
Millville Township is named from the mill constructed there about 1833.

Geography
Neighboring townships include Mallory Township, Jefferson Township, and Buena Vista Township. According to the USGS, it contains six cemeteries: Bierer, Friedlein, Goshen, Graham, Griffith and Redman.

The stream of Little Turkey River runs through this township.

References

 USGS Geographic Names Information System (GNIS)

External links
 US-Counties.com
 City-Data.com

Townships in Clayton County, Iowa
Townships in Iowa